Good Life is a compilation of the best songs by golden age hip hop group Pete Rock & CL Smooth. It contains singles and highlights from their two full-length albums and one EP, as well as leftover songs from soundtracks. It also contains the Pete Rock single "Take Your Time", one of the only songs by the duo that doesn't feature a performance by CL Smooth.

Track listing
All songs produced by Pete Rock & CL Smooth, except for "Lots of Lovin'" which contains additional production by Nevelle Hodge.

References 

2003 greatest hits albums
Pete Rock & CL Smooth albums
Albums produced by Pete Rock